Lygodactylus grandisonae, also known commonly as Bunty's dwarf gecko, Grandison's dwarf gecko,  and the Kenya dwarf gecko, is a species of lizard in the family Gekkonidae. The species is native to East Africa and the Horn of Africa.

Etymology
The specific name, grandisonae, is in honor of British herpetologist Alice Georgie Cruikshank "Bunty" Grandison (1927–2014).

Geographic range
L. grandisonae is  found in Ethiopia and Kenya.

Habitat

Reproduction
L. grandisonae is oviparous.

References

Further reading
Largen MJ, Spawls S (2010). Amphibians and Reptiles of Ethiopia and Eritrea. Frankfurt am Main: Edition Chimaira / Serpents Tale. 694 pp. . (Lygodactylus grandisonae, p. 324).
Pasteur G (1962). "Notes préliminaires sur les lygodactyles (gekkonidés). II. Diagnose de quelques Lygodactylus d'Afrque". Bulletin de l'Institut fondamental d'Afrique noire 24: 606–614. (Lygodactylus grandisonae, new species). (in French).
Rösler H (2000). "Kommentierte Liste der rezent, subrezent und fossil bekannten Geckotaxa (Reptilia: Gekkonomorpha)". Gekkota 2: 28–153. (Lygodactylus grandisonae, p. 93). (in German).
Spawls S, Howell K, Hinkel H, Menegon M (2018). Field Guide to East African Reptiles, Second Edition. London: Bloomsbury Natural History. 624 pp. . (Lygodactylus grandisonae, p. 104).

Lygodactylus
Reptiles described in 1962
Reptiles of Ethiopia
Reptiles of Kenya